Dr. Prakash Baba Amte – The Real Hero is a Marathi film starring Nana Patekar, Sonali Kulkarni and Mohan Agashe in lead roles. It is a biopic on the lives of Dr Prakash Baba Amte, the son of the social worker Baba Amte, and his wife Mandakini Amte. Dr. Prakash Amte is a doctor and social worker who devotes his life to the development and uplifting of the tribal people in the forests of eastern Maharashtra state.

Release
The film was released in Maharashtra with overall positive reviews on 10 October 2014.

Plot
This movie showcases the life of Dr. Prakash Baba Amte, a man who dedicates himself to helping those in society who suffer from disadvantages. He was unaware of the extent to which his efforts were being noticed and became an inspiration to others by teaching the attitude of self-actualization.

After finishing his medical degree, Prakash's father, Baba Amte, took him on a picnic to Hemalkasa. This was a turning point in Prakash's life. He became restless seeing that, while mankind had reached the moon, there were people who still lived in abject poverty. They used to hunt and sleep under trees. Prakash moved there to treat them and help them by sharing their privations.

Dr. Mandakini and Prakash had been in love since their college days. Leaving her luxurious life behind, she accompanied Prakash without any conditions. This is where the real story begins in the dense forest of Hemalkasa. They struggle with tribal communities, wild animals, Naxalite insurgents, and corrupt government officials. Today, after 45 years, Hemalkasa has become an example of positive development in the world.

Cast
Nana Patekar as Dr. Prakash Baba Amte
Sonali Kulkarni as Mandakini Amte
Mohan Agashe as Baba Amte
Mayuri Deshmukh
Tejashri Pradhan as Young Mandakini Amte
Ashish Chougule
Vikram Gaikwad
Bharat Ganeshpure
Aniruddha Wankar
Vinayak Patwardhan
Kunal Gajbhare
Sushant Kakde
Sukumar Day
Prasad Dhakulkar
Naina Rani
Krishna Dharme
williemgc
Vinod Raut

Filming
The film was shot in locations including Hemalkasa, Mumbai, United States, etc.

Reception
The release clashed with two other Marathi films, Ishq Wala Love and Punha Gondhal Punha Mujra.

The acting prowess of Nana Patekar, Sonali Kulkarni & Mohan Aagashe added more stars to the inspiring story. Times of India gave it 3.5 stars, calling it a must-watch film with the whole family. It earned  in the first 2 weeks. Dr. Prakash continued its success and collected  within 6 weeks, becoming one of the top hit movies of the year 2014.

Awards 
Filmfare Marathi Awards

 Best Film (won)
 Best Actor - Nana Patekar (won)
 Best Actress - Sonali Kulkarni (won)

References

External links
 
 

2010s Marathi-language films
Indian biographical films
2010s biographical films